Thioredoxin domain-containing protein 9 is a protein that in humans is encoded by the TXNDC9 gene.

The protein encoded by this gene is a member of the thioredoxin family. The exact function of this protein is not known but it is associated with cell differentiation.

References

Further reading

External links